was a former village located in Minamiaizu District, Fukushima Prefecture, Japan.

As of 2003, the village had an estimated population of 2,994 and a density of 25.05 persons per km². The total area was 119.50 km².

On March 20, 2006, Nangō, along with town of Tajima, and the villages of Ina and Tateiwa (all from Minamiaizu District), was merged to create the town of Minamiaizu.

Nangō is famous throughout Fukushima for its tomatoes.

Nangō is one of many rural areas in Japan that suffers from the problem of having a large aged population but relatively few young people. As of March 2006, there were more people aged 90 and above than people between the ages of 20 and 24 living in Nangō.

Nangō's ski and snowboard area attracts people from as far south as Tokyo. It is home to ski courses of varying difficulty, but known best for its large snowboard park.

Climate

References

External links
 Minamiaizu official website 

Dissolved municipalities of Fukushima Prefecture
Minamiaizu, Fukushima